Jean-Louis Faure may refer to:

Jean-Louis Faure (surgeon) (1863–1944), French surgeon
Jean-Louis Faure (sculptor) (1931–2022), French sculptor and writer
 (1953–2022), French actor and director